John Givens may refer to:

 John Givens (footballer), Scottish footballer
 John Givens (basketball), American basketball player and coach
 John Givez, American musician born John Lawrence Givens